Gallaher Group was a United Kingdom-based multinational tobacco company which traded on the London Stock Exchange and was a constituent of the FTSE 100 Index, prior to its acquisition by Japan Tobacco in April 2007.  Japan Tobacco trades in the United Kingdom as Gallaher Ltd.

History
The business was founded in 1857 by Tom Gallaher in Derry, Ireland (now part of Northern Ireland.) By 1896, he had opened the largest tobacco factory in the world in Belfast. The business was incorporated on 28 March 1896 to "carry on in all their branches the businesses of tobacco, cigar, cigarettes and snuff manufacture".

Formerly manufacturing in London and Dublin, Gallaher moved production to Belfast (cigarettes) and Wales (cigars) in the early 20th century.

Gallaher went on to acquire a number of rival companies including J. A. Pattreiouex (1937), J. R. Freeman (1947), Cope Bros & Co (1952) and Benson & Hedges (1955).

Gallaher held a Royal Warrant of Appointment for 122 years, until the warrant was revoked in 1999 by Queen Elizabeth II. Her son, the Prince of Wales' rigorous anti-smoking campaigning is thought to have been a major influence behind that decision. Gallaher was allowed one year to remove the Royal Coat of Arms from its brands bearing the mark on their packaging.

On 4 August 2000 Gallaher completed the acquisition of Liggett Ducat, Russia's number one cigarette brand. In January 2002, Gallaher became the 100% owner of Austria's former nationalised biggest tobacco-company Austria Tabak.

In 2002 US tobacco firm Reynolds formed Reynolds-Gallaher International to access cigarette sales in most countries in the European Union. The agreement was scheduled to run through 2012 but in May 2007, as a result of the acquisition of Gallaher Group by Japan Tobacco, it was announced that this joint-venture would cease in November 2007.

Japan Tobacco became the sole owner of the Gallaher Group on 18 April 2007, in the largest ever foreign acquisition in Japanese history.

The closure of the former J. R. Freeman's factory in Cardiff was announced in September 2007, with all work scheduled to move to the Ballymena factory by September 2009.

In 2015, JTI Gallaher announced the closure of their Ballymena operations with all work due to re-locate to Eastern Europe in a cost saving measure by 2017. This resulted in the loss of over 1000 jobs in the town and ceasing of tobacco production in Ireland by Gallaher's after more than 100 years.

Operations
Until acquisition by Japan Tobacco, Gallaher operated primarily in the United Kingdom and Europe, with smaller operations in Central Asia, Africa and the Middle East. Gallaher was the third largest of the three major British tobacco groups after British American Tobacco and Imperial Tobacco.

Gallaher-owned brands included Benson & Hedges (with Philip Morris International, British American Tobacco, and Japan Tobacco), Silk Cut, Sterling, Mayfair, Crystal, Nil, Kensitas Club, Senior Service, Dos Hermanos, Gold Seal, Amber Leaf, Sobranie, Hamlet Cigars, Logic (vape) and Nordic Spirit (nicotine pouch).

The Djarum products include Djarum Super, Djarum Black, Djarum Coklat, Djarum 76, Djarum Istimewa, Djarum Special, Djarum Menthol, Djarum Vanilla, Djarum Cherry, LA Lights, Mustang, Mr. Brown, and Envio Mild. Djarum Group's relationship with Gallaher Group has not been properly confirmed, since PT Djarum is a private Indonesian company, with the majority of its shares owned by the Hartono family.

Gallaher owned Wismilak, which is the 6th largest cigarette company in Indonesia. However, this ownership was not recorded in Wismilak Group Shareholders list as per 31 December 2014.

In the UK, Japan Tobacco International maintains a national distribution centre in Crewe and Business Service Centre in Manchester.

References

External links
 
 https://www.jti.com/europe/united-kingdom

Companies established in 1857
Tobacco companies of the United Kingdom
Companies formerly listed on the London Stock Exchange
Companies based in Surrey
Japan Tobacco
1857 establishments in Ireland
2007 mergers and acquisitions